Preliminary Round 1 of the Men's Asian Qualifiers for the 2012 Olympic football tournament was held on 23 February 2011 and 9 March 2011. It was played in a two-legged system. The draw was made on October 20, 2010. The 11 winners from the preliminary round will join the 13 higher ranked teams in two-legged knock-out ties to be played on 19 and 23 June 2011.

Seeding for the draw 
11 teams have been seeded and 11 unseeded on the basis of ranking of Asian qualifiers and final round of 2008 Beijing Olympics men's football tournament:

Matches

First leg 

Palestine was awarded a 3-0 win to Palestine after Thailand fielding an ineligible player, Sujarit Jantakul. The original score was 1–0 to Thailand

Second leg 

1–1 on aggregate. Thailand won after penalties, but Palestine will replace them in the second round after fielding an ineligible player.

Kuwait won 5–0 on aggregate.

Jordan won 3–0 on aggregate.

Hong Kong won 7–0 on aggregate.

Iran won 1–0 on aggregate.

Turkmenistan won 4–1 on aggregate.

Oman won 7–2 on aggregate.

India won 3–2 on aggregate.

Malaysia won 2–0 on aggregate.

United Arab Emirates won 10–1 on aggregate.

Yemen won 3–0 on aggregate.

 Note: Sri Lanka's home game was played away (in United Arab Emirates).

References

External links 
 Official site of the AFC Men's Olympic Qualifiers

1